Doraha means crossroads in Hindi, Urdu and Punjabi languages. It may refer to:

Places 

 Doraha, Ludhiana, a city in Ludhiana district, Punjab, India
 Doraha Sarai in Doraha, Ludhiana
 Doraha, Sehore, a village in Sehore district, Madhya Pradesh, India

Entertainment 

 Doraha (TV series), a Pakistani drama television series
 Doraha (film), a 1967 Pakistani Urdu black & white film